Elective may refer to:

Choice, the mental process of judging the merits of multiple options and selecting one of them
Elective course in education
Elective (medical), a period of study forming part of a medical degree
 In medical procedures, planned interventions, as opposed to emergency care
 Elective surgery
 An adjective for election
Elective monarchy, a monarchy ruled by an elected monarch, in contrast to a hereditary monarchy